The 1992–93 New York Rangers season was the franchise's 67th season. The Rangers, coming off a Presidents' Trophy-winning 1991–92 season, finished with a 34–39–11 record in the regular season. The team finished last in the Patrick Division and missed the playoffs.

Roger Neilson entered his fourth season as Rangers head coach, but was fired midway through the season and replaced by Ron Smith.

Regular season
On December 15, 1992, the Rangers were shut-out at home 3–0 by the Calgary Flames. It was the first time the Rangers had been shut out in a regular season game since December 17, 1989, when they lost at home 2–0 to the Montreal Canadiens. Prior to their loss to the Flames, the Rangers had gone 236 consecutive regular-season games without being shut-out.

Final standings

Schedule and results

|- align="center" bgcolor="#CCFFCC"
| 1 || 9 || @ Washington Capitals || 4–2 || 1–0–0
|- align="center" bgcolor="#FFBBBB"
| 2 || 10 || @ New Jersey Devils || 4–2 || 1–1–0
|- align="center" bgcolor="#CCFFCC"
| 3 || 12 || Hartford Whalers || 6–2 || 2–1–0
|- align="center" bgcolor="#CCFFCC"
| 4 || 14 || New Jersey Devils || 6–1 || 3–1–0
|- align="center" bgcolor="#FFBBBB"
| 5 || 17 || @ New York Islanders || 6–3 || 3–2–0
|- align="center" bgcolor="#CCFFCC"
| 6 || 18 || New York Islanders || 4–3 || 4–2–0
|- align="center" bgcolor="#CCFFCC"
| 7 || 21 || Washington Capitals || 2–1 || 5–2–0
|- align="center" bgcolor="white"
| 8 || 23 || Montreal Canadiens || 3–3 OT || 5–2–1
|- align="center" bgcolor="#CCFFCC"
| 9 || 24 || @ Ottawa Senators || 3–2 OT || 6–2–1
|- align="center" bgcolor="#CCFFCC"
| 10 || 26 || Philadelphia Flyers || 8–4 || 7–2–1
|- align="center" bgcolor="#FFBBBB"
| 11 || 29 || Quebec Nordiques || 6–3 || 7–3–1
|- align="center" bgcolor="#FFBBBB"
| 12 || 31 || @ Montreal Canadiens || 4–3 || 7–4–1
|-

|- align="center" bgcolor="#CCFFCC"
| 13 || 2 || Buffalo Sabres || 7–6 OT || 8–4–1
|- align="center" bgcolor="#CCFFCC"
| 14 || 4 || Philadelphia Flyers || 3–1 || 9–4–1
|- align="center" bgcolor="white"
| 15 || 7 || @ Boston Bruins || 2–2 OT || 9–4–2
|- align="center" bgcolor="#FFBBBB"
| 16 || 9 || Tampa Bay Lightning || 5–1 || 9–5–2
|- align="center" bgcolor="#FFBBBB"
| 17 || 11 || Washington Capitals || 7–4 || 9–6–2
|- align="center" bgcolor="#FFBBBB"
| 18 || 14 || @ Quebec Nordiques || 6–3 || 9–7–2
|- align="center" bgcolor="#FFBBBB"
| 19 || 19 || @ Philadelphia Flyers || 7–3 || 9–8–2
|- align="center" bgcolor="#CCFFCC"
| 20 || 21 || @ Winnipeg Jets || 5–4 || 10–8–2
|- align="center" bgcolor="#FFBBBB"
| 21 || 23 || Pittsburgh Penguins || 5–2 || 10–9–2
|- align="center" bgcolor="#CCFFCC"
| 22 || 25 || @ Pittsburgh Penguins || 11–3 || 11–9–2
|- align="center" bgcolor="white"
| 23 || 27 || @ Minnesota North Stars || 4–4 OT || 11–9–3
|- align="center" bgcolor="#FFBBBB"
| 24 || 30 || Minnesota North Stars || 4–2 || 11–10–3
|-

|- align="center" bgcolor="#CCFFCC"
| 25 || 2 || Detroit Red Wings || 5–3 || 12–10–3
|- align="center" bgcolor="#FFBBBB"
| 26 || 4 || @ Washington Capitals || 8–4 || 12–11–3
|- align="center" bgcolor="#CCFFCC"
| 27 || 6 || Toronto Maple Leafs || 6–0 || 13–11–3
|- align="center" bgcolor="#CCFFCC"
| 28 || 9 || Tampa Bay Lightning || 6–5 || 14–11–3
|- align="center" bgcolor="#CCFFCC"
| 29 || 11 || @ Tampa Bay Lightning || 5–4 || 15–11–3
|- align="center" bgcolor="#CCFFCC"
| 30 || 13 || Montreal Canadiens || 10–5 || 16–11–3
|- align="center" bgcolor="#FFBBBB"
| 31 || 15 || Calgary Flames || 3–0 || 16–12–3
|- align="center" bgcolor="#CCFFCC"
| 32 || 17 || @ St. Louis Blues || 4–3 || 17–12–3
|- align="center" bgcolor="white"
| 33 || 19 || @ Hartford Whalers || 4–4 OT || 17–12–4
|- align="center" bgcolor="#CCFFCC"
| 34 || 21 || @ New Jersey Devils || 3–0 || 18–12–4
|- align="center" bgcolor="#FFBBBB"
| 35 || 23 || New Jersey Devils || 5–4 OT || 18–13–4
|- align="center" bgcolor="#FFBBBB"
| 36 || 26 || @ New York Islanders || 6–4 || 18–14–4
|- align="center" bgcolor="#CCFFCC"
| 37 || 27 || Boston Bruins || 6–5 || 19–14–4
|- align="center" bgcolor="#FFBBBB"
| 38 || 29 || @ Washington Capitals || 4–3 OT || 19–15–4
|- align="center" bgcolor="#FFBBBB"
| 39 || 31 || @ Buffalo Sabres || 11–6 || 19–16–4
|-

|- align="center" bgcolor="#FFBBBB"
| 40 || 2 || @ Pittsburgh Penguins || 5–2 || 19–17–4
|- align="center" bgcolor="white"
| 41 || 4 || New Jersey Devils || 3–3 OT || 19–17–5
|- align="center" bgcolor="#CCFFCC"
| 42 || 6 || Ottawa Senators || 6–2 || 20–17–5
|- align="center" bgcolor="#FFBBBB"
| 43 || 9 || @ Philadelphia Flyers || 4–3 || 20–18–5
|- align="center" bgcolor="white"
| 44 || 11 || Vancouver Canucks || 3–3 OT || 20–18–6
|- align="center" bgcolor="#CCFFCC"
| 45 || 13 || Washington Capitals || 5–4 || 21–18–6
|- align="center" bgcolor="#FFBBBB"
| 46 || 16 || @ Montreal Canadiens || 3–0 || 21–19–6
|- align="center" bgcolor="white"
| 47 || 19 || @ Detroit Red Wings || 2–2 OT || 21–19–7
|- align="center" bgcolor="#CCFFCC"
| 48 || 23 || @ Los Angeles Kings || 8–3 || 22–19–7
|- align="center" bgcolor="#CCFFCC"
| 49 || 27 || Winnipeg Jets || 5–2 || 23–19–7
|- align="center" bgcolor="#FFBBBB"
| 50 || 29 || @ Buffalo Sabres || 6–4 || 23–20–7
|- align="center" bgcolor="#FFBBBB"
| 51 || 30 || @ Toronto Maple Leafs || 3–1 || 23–21–7
|-

|- align="center" bgcolor="white"
| 52 || 1 || @ New York Islanders || 4–4 OT || 23–21–8
|- align="center" bgcolor="white"
| 53 || 3 || Philadelphia Flyers || 2–2 OT || 23–21–9
|- align="center" bgcolor="#FFBBBB"
| 54 || 8 || @ New Jersey Devils || 5–4 || 23–22–9
|- align="center" bgcolor="#FFBBBB"
| 55 || 10 || Pittsburgh Penguins || 3–0 || 23–23–9
|- align="center" bgcolor="#CCFFCC"
| 56 || 12 || New York Islanders || 4–3 || 24–23–9
|- align="center" bgcolor="#FFBBBB"
| 57 || 13 || @ New York Islanders || 5–2 || 24–24–9
|- align="center" bgcolor="#CCFFCC"
| 58 || 15 || St. Louis Blues || 4–1 || 25–24–9
|- align="center" bgcolor="#CCFFCC"
| 59 || 20 || @ San Jose Sharks || 6–4 || 26–24–9
|- align="center" bgcolor="#CCFFCC"
| 60 || 22 || @ San Jose Sharks || 4–0 || 27–24–9
|- align="center" bgcolor="#FFBBBB"
| 61 || 24 || @ Vancouver Canucks || 5–4 || 27–25–9
|- align="center" bgcolor="white"
| 62 || 26 || @ Calgary Flames || 4–4 OT || 27–25–10
|- align="center" bgcolor="#CCFFCC"
| 63 || 27 || @ Edmonton Oilers || 1–0 || 28–25–10
|-

|- align="center" bgcolor="white"
| 64 || 3 || Buffalo Sabres || 2–2 OT || 28–25–11
|- align="center" bgcolor="#CCFFCC"
| 65 || 5 || Pittsburgh Penguins || 3–1 || 29–25–11
|- align="center" bgcolor="#FFBBBB"
| 66 || 6 || @ Quebec Nordiques || 10–2 || 29–26–11
|- align="center" bgcolor="#CCFFCC"
| 67 || 9 || Los Angeles Kings || 4–3 || 30–26–11
|- align="center" bgcolor="#CCFFCC"
| 68 || 11 || @ Chicago Blackhawks || 4–1 || 31–26–11
|- align="center" bgcolor="#FFBBBB"
| 69 || 15 || Boston Bruins || 3–1 || 31–27–11
|- align="center" bgcolor="#FFBBBB"
| 70 || 17 || Edmonton Oilers || 4–3 OT || 31–28–11
|- align="center" bgcolor="#CCFFCC"
| 71 || 19 || San Jose Sharks || 8–1 || 32–28–11
|- align="center" bgcolor="#CCFFCC"
| 72 || 22 || @ Ottawa Senators || 5–4 || 33–28–11
|- align="center" bgcolor="#FFBBBB"
| 73 || 24 || Philadelphia Flyers || 5–4 || 33–29–11
|- align="center" bgcolor="#FFBBBB"
| 74 || 26 || Chicago Blackhawks || 3–1 || 33–30–11
|- align="center" bgcolor="#FFBBBB"
| 75 || 28 || Quebec Nordiques || 3–2 || 33–31–11
|-

|- align="center" bgcolor="#FFBBBB"
| 76 || 2 || New York Islanders || 3–2 OT || 33–32–11
|- align="center" bgcolor="#CCFFCC"
| 77 || 4 || @ Washington Capitals || 4–0 || 34–32–11
|- align="center" bgcolor="#FFBBBB"
| 78 || 5 || Hartford Whalers || 5–4 || 34–33–11
|- align="center" bgcolor="#FFBBBB"
| 79 || 7 || @ New Jersey Devils || 5–2 || 34–34–11
|- align="center" bgcolor="#FFBBBB"
| 80 || 9 || Pittsburgh Penguins || 10–4 || 34–35–11
|- align="center" bgcolor="#FFBBBB"
| 81 || 10 || @ Pittsburgh Penguins || 4–2 || 34–36–11
|- align="center" bgcolor="#FFBBBB"
| 82 || 12 || @ Philadelphia Flyers || 1–0 || 34–37–11
|- align="center" bgcolor="#FFBBBB"
| 83 || 14 || Washington Capitals || 2–0 || 34–38–11
|- align="center" bgcolor="#FFBBBB"
| 84 || 16 || @ Washington Capitals || 4–2 || 34–39–11
|-

Playoffs
The Rangers failed to qualify for the 1993 Stanley Cup playoffs, missing the postseason for the first time since 1988.

Player statistics
Skaters

Goaltenders

†Denotes player spent time with another team before joining Rangers. Stats reflect time with Rangers only.
‡Traded mid-season. Stats reflect time with Rangers only.

Draft picks
New York's picks at the 1992 NHL Entry Draft in Montreal, Quebec, Canada at the Montreal Forum.

References

New York Rangers seasons
New York Rangers
New York Rangers
New York Rangers
New York Rangers
1990s in Manhattan
Madison Square Garden